Grandvilliers ( or) is a commune in the Oise department in northern France. Grandvilliers station has rail connections to Beauvais and Le Tréport.

Twinning 
In 2004, the town was twinned with the Irish town of Athy in the south-west of County Kildare. The Irish twinning committee is named "La Balad'Irlandaise", and official visits take place every two years, while musical and student exchanges take place more regularly.

See also
 Communes of the Oise department

References

Communes of Oise
Picardy